Gli Amori Son Finestre is the second live album of Italian singer Mango, published in 2009 and part of the Acchiappanuvole Tour.

The album contains twenty-nine tracks, including two unreleased songs and one poem recited by actor Flavio Insinna, entitled "Gli Amori Son Finestre".

Francesco Melzi's painting Flora was used for the album cover.

Disco 1
 E poi di nuovo la notte  (unreleased track)
 Contro tutti i pronostici (unreleased track)
 Gli amori son finestre (poetry)
 Intro
 Pride
 Luce
 La canzone dell'amore perduto
 Amore bello
 Mediterraneo
 Dio mio no
 La rosa dell'inverno
 Lei verrà
 Come Monna Lisa
 La stagione dell'amore
 Bella d'estate

Disco 2
 Australia
 Chissà dove te ne vai
 Quando
 Il dicembre degli aranci
 Ti porto in Africa
 Love
 Come l'acqua
 Sirtaki
 Amore per te
 Sentirti
 Oro
 Chissà se nevica
 I migliori anni della nostra vita
 La rondine

References 

2009 live albums
Mango albums